Melanderia is a genus of flies in the family Dolichopodidae.

Species
The genus is divided into two subgenera, Melanderia and Wirthia:
Subgenus Melanderia Aldrich, 1922:
Melanderia crepuscula Arnaud, 1958
Melanderia mandibulata Aldrich, 1922
Subgenus Wirthia Arnaud, 1958:
Melanderia californica Harmston, 1972
Melanderia curvipes (Van Duzee, 1918)

References

Hydrophorinae
Dolichopodidae genera
Taxa named by John Merton Aldrich
Diptera of North America